Łukasz Kubot and Marcelo Melo were the two-time defending champions, but lost in the final to Raven Klaasen and Michael Venus, 6–4, 3–6, [4–10].

Seeds

Draw

Draw

Qualifying

Seeds

Qualifiers
  Marcelo Demoliner /  Divij Sharan

Lucky losers
  Matthew Ebden /  Denis Kudla

Qualifying draw

References

 Main draw
 Qualifying draw

2019 Halle Open